San Carlos is a former settlement in Inyo County, California.

Tensions in the area ran high as the residents of San Carlos with their cattle ramped up pressure on the local Indians, causing the latter to launch attacks on the town's population. San Carlos and nearby Bend City competed to become the seat of the then Coso County. Several artifacts remain of San Carlos, including the ruins of stone buildings as well as old smelting tools.

References

Former settlements in Inyo County, California
Populated places established in 1863
Ghost towns in Inyo County, California